Federal Route 65 is a federal road in Kuala Nerus and Kuala Terengganu, Terengganu, Malaysia.

Overview

Jalan Lapangan Terbang Sultan Mahmud
Jalan Lapangan Terbang Sultan Mahmud is a federal road linking Wakaf Tembesu junctions until the Sultan Mahmud Airport at Seberang Takir.

Jalan Tengku Mizan
Jalan Tengku Mizan (formerly Terengganu State Route T4) is a major highway in Kuala Nerus and Kuala Terengganu, Terengganu, linking Bulatan to Bukit Besar.

Route background 
The Kilometre Zero of the Federal Route 65 starts at Sultan Mahmud Airport junctions.

Features

At most sections, the Federal Route 65 was built under the JKR R5 road standard, allowing maximum speed limit of up to 90 km/h.

There is one overlap: Wakaf Tembesu-Bulatan - Federal Route 3685 Jalan Tengku Ampuan Intan Zaharah

There is no alternate route, and one section with motorcycle lanes: Jalan Tengku Mizan.

List of junctions and towns

References

Malaysian Federal Roads